Mikko Alikoski (born July 28, 1986) is a Finnish ice hockey player. He was last known to played professionally for KooKoo (Liiga) of the Finnish Liiga.

Alikoski made his SM-liiga debut playing with Oulun Kärpät during the 2003–04 SM-liiga season.

References

External links

1986 births
Finnish ice hockey forwards
Living people
Kiekko-Laser players
KooKoo players
Oulun Kärpät players
Espoo Blues players
Sportspeople from Oulu